The Satanist is a black magic/horror novel by Dennis Wheatley. Published in 1960, it is characterized by an anti-communist spy theme. The novel was one of the popular novels of the 1960s popularizing the tabloid notion of a black mass.

The novel follows on from To the Devil – a Daughter, a successful occult novel from January 1953, later filmed in 1976 and features from the earlier novel Colonel Verney, an anti-Soviet anti-black magic British spymaster. The plot concerns Mary Morden, a young widow, and Verney's special agent Barney Sullivan who infiltrate a satanic cult. In doing so they foil a communist plot to conquer the world.

The novel presents conservative political and social views, and a conservative picture of the hero's masculinity.

The novel was published by Hutchinson & Co. who coincidentally had published the gothic novel of the same name by Mrs Hugh Fraser in 1912.

References

1960 British novels
British horror novels
Novels by Dennis Wheatley